The term Landrace pig or Landrace swine refers to any of a group of standardized breeds of domestic pig, and in this context the word Landrace is typically capitalized.  The original breed by this name was the Danish Landrace pig, from which the others were derived through development and crossbreeding.  The breed was so-named because the foundation stock of the Danish Landrace were specimens from the local, free-breeding, non-pedigreed stock of swine, i.e. the regional landrace native to Denmark.  The modern breeds are not themselves landraces, since they are formal breeds maintained through selective breeding rather than natural selection.  The establishment and spread of the Danish breed gave the word landrace to the English language (it had already existed in Danish, German, Dutch and some other Germanic languages).  Sources from the mid-20th century often mean the Danish Landrace swine in particular when referring to "Landrace" pigs, as most of the others had not been developed yet.

List of Landrace pig breeds
The most common Landrace pig breeds are:
American Landrace pig
Belgian Landrace pig
British Landrace pig
Bulgarian Landrace pig
Canadian Landrace pig
Danish Landrace pig
Dutch Landrace pig
Estonian Landrace pig (a.k.a. Estonian Bacon pig)
Finnish Landrace pig
French Landrace pig
German Landrace pig
Italian Landrace pig
Norwegian Landrace pig
Polish Landrace pig
South African Landrace pig
Swedish Landrace pig
Swiss Landrace pig
Several have selectively bred varieties, and many have alternative names.

References

Pig breeds